Paweł Althamer (born 12 May 1967, Warsaw) is a Polish contemporary sculptor, performer, collaborative artist and creator of installations, and video art.

Life and work
In the years 1988-1993, he studied sculpture at the Warsaw Academy of Fine Arts. Since the mid-1990s, he has been collaborating with the Foksal Gallery in Warsaw. In 2000, he participated in Manifesta 3 in Ljubljana, Slovenia. In 2004, he won the Vincent Award from the Broere Charitable Foundation in the Netherlands. In 2007, he presented the exhibition One of many with the Nicola Trussardi Foundation.

His longest-running collaboration is with the Nowolipie Group, an organisation in Warsaw for adults with mental or physical disabilities, to whom he has been teaching a Friday night ceramics class since the early 1990s. In 2008 Althamer arranged for the group to wear matching overalls and take a trip on a biplane, which became the subject of a short film by Althamer’s frequent collaborator, Artur Żmijewski (Winged, 2008). 

Althamer was part of the so-called Kowalski Studio at the Warsaw Academy of Fine Arts, along with many of today’s leading generation of Polish artists, including Artur Żmijewski and Katarzyna Kozyra. Under the working title ‘Common Space—Private Space’, Kowalski foregrounded the work of art as an effect of complex non-verbal communication performed by artists in interaction with each other, neutralising individualism: ‘each of the participants had at his/her disposal “a space of their own” […], where they could build elements of their own visual language, and the “common space” open to everyone, where they could conduct simultaneous dialogues with the other participants. All without using words.’

Althamer's large series of works "The Venetians" was exhibited in the arsenale section of the 2013 Venice Biennale. In 2015, he was awarded the Officer's Cross of the Order of Polonia Restituta for his artistic achievements.

He is represented by Neugerriemschneider, Berlin and Fundacja Galerii Foksal, Warsaw.  His solo exhibitions include Bonnefantenmuseum, Maastricht, Institute of Contemporary Arts, London, Deutsche Guggenheim, Berlin, Musée National d’Art Moderne, Centre Georges Pompidou, Paris New Museum of Contemporary Art, New York, and Helsinki Art Museum.

Further reading
 Paula Van Den Bosch and others, Pawel Althamer: The Vincent Award 2004, Hatje Cantz (2005) 
 Pawel Althamer: Espace 315, Centre Georges Pompidou Service Commercial (2006),  - see also 
 Common Task, Pawel Althamer, Modern Art Oxford (2009), edited by Suzanne Cotter, co-edited and designed by Åbäke, printed in Brodno, Poland.
 Pawel Althamer, by Adam Szymczyk, Suzanne Cotter and Roman Kurzmeyer, Phaidon Press (2011) 
 Claire Bishop, "Something for Everyone: The Art of Pawel Althamer’, Artforum, February, pp.175-181.
 Pawel Althamer - I (am), by Satu Metsola, Pirkko Siitari and Sanna Tuulikangas, Parvs (2019)

See also
List of Polish artists
Igor Mitoraj
Alina Szapocznikow
Wilhelm Sasnal

References

External links
Paweł Althamer at Culture.pl 
Pawel Althamer at Fondazione Nicola Trussardi

1967 births
Living people
Polish contemporary artists
Polish sculptors
Polish male sculptors
Artists from Warsaw